

The Extra 230 was a single-seat aerobatic aircraft developed in Germany in the early 1980s. Designed by aerobatic pilot Walter Extra based on the layout of the Laser 200 he was previously flying, the Extra 230 was a conventional (if short-coupled) mid-wing cantilever monoplane with fixed tailwheel undercarriage and a wire-braced empennage. The fuselage and empennage were of steel tube construction, but the wings were wooden. Production continued until 1990, at which time it was replaced by the Extra 300

Specifications

References

 
 
 

1980s German sport aircraft
EA-230
Aerobatic aircraft
Mid-wing aircraft
Single-engined tractor aircraft
Aircraft first flown in 1983